Charles Golding may refer to:

Charles Golding (broadcaster), for LBC
Sir Charles Golding, 2nd Baronet (–1661) of the Golding Baronets
Charles Golding, character in Tender Is the Night (film)

See also